</ref>
This is a list of notable students, alumni, faculty or academic affiliates associated with Colgate University in the United States. As Colgate is an undergraduate school only, all the graduates listed below earned bachelor's degrees there.

Colgate alumni

The Arts
 Charles Addams (1933), New Yorker cartoonist known for macabre drawings and creator of The Addams Family
 Ralph Arlyck (1962), documentary filmmaker who has won many awards at film festivals including Sundance and Cannes
 Ivy Austin (1979), television and radio actress (A Prairie Home Companion, Sesame Street)
 Ken Baker (1992), E! Chief News Correspondent, Author
 Bob Balaban, television and movie actor
 Joe Berlinger (1983), producer (Book of Shadows: Blair Witch 2; documentary Brother’s Keeper)
 Edgar Peters Bowron (1965), art historian
 Lin Brehmer (1976), American disc jockey and radio personality at WXRT in Chicago
 Steven Cantor (1990) Director and Producer (DANCER, Chasing Tyson, What Remains, Between Me and My Mind, more)
 Jay Chandrasekhar (1991), director (Super Troopers, Arrested Development, Club Dread, The Babymakers)
 Rex Cherryman (1916), actor of the stage and screen whose career was most prolific during the 1920s
 Kris Cole (1979), Feature Motion Picture Editor
 Alison Fields (2001), art historian
 Jonathan Glatzer (1991), television writer (Bloodline, Better Call Saul, Succession)
 Ted Griffin (1993), film writer (Ocean's Eleven, Matchstick Men)
 Kevin Heffernan (1990), actor/comedian (Super Troopers, Club Dread, Beerfest)
 Lisa Heller (2018), alternative pop artist and songwriter
 James D. Hornfischer (1987), literary agent
 John J.A. Jannone (1991), composer, animator, film producer (Small Time), founder of Performance and Interactive Media Arts M.F.A. program
 Barnet Kellman (1969), producer and director of film and television (Murphy Brown, Mad About You) and multiple Emmy and DGA Award winner
 R. J. Kern (2000), artist and photographer
 Steve Lemme (1991), actor, comedian (Super Troopers, Club Dread, Beerfest)
 Brent Maddock (1972), screenwriter (Short Circuit, Tremors)
 Paul Mariani, American poet and a professor at Boston College
 Johnny Marks (1931), composer of "Rudolph the Red-Nosed Reindeer," etc.
 Chris Paine (1983), documentary filmmaker (Who Killed the Electric Car?)
 John Romano (1970), John Romano is an American screenwriter and television writer and producer. 
 Martin Ransohoff (1949), founder and chief executive officer of Filmways
 Peter Rowan, bluegrass musician, songwriter ("Panama Red")
 David Rosengarten, chef, author and host of the Food Network show Taste
 Todd Rosenthal (1989), Tony Award-winning scenic designer
 Jeffrey Sharp (1989), producer (Boys Don't Cry, You Can Count On Me, Proof)
 Paul Soter (1991), actor/comedian (Super Troopers, Club Dread, Beerfest)
 Erik Stolhanske (1991), actor/comedian (Super Troopers, Club Dread, Beerfest)
 Gillian Vigman (1994), actor/comedian (Sons and Daughters, MADtv)
 Mel Watkins (1962), writer, editor, social commentator
 Francesca Zambello (1978), Director of the Glimmerglass Opera and the Washington National Opera
 Broken Lizard, comedy troupe (Super Troopers, Club Dread, Beerfest)
 Poppy Liu (2013), actress, activist and poet (Sunnyside and Hacks)

Business
 John Acropolis (1909-1952), labor leader 
 Warren Anderson (1942), former CEO of Union Carbide
 Jonathan Michael Ansell (1972), current CEO of Fusion Company
 J. Darius Bikoff (1983), creator, Energy Brands, Inc, makers of Glaceau, vitaminwater, and Glaceau smartwater.
 Lawrence Bossidy (1957), chairman, CEO, Honeywell International; former CEO, AlliedSignal Inc.
 Bruce Buck (1967), partner, Skadden, Arps, Slate, Meagher & Flom; Chairman, Chelsea Football Club
 Steve Burke (1980), president and CEO, NBCUniversal; former COO, Comcast
 Chase Carey (1976), Vice Chairman of the 21st Century Fox media conglomerate and the Chairman of the Formula One Group
 Ben Cohen (1973), co-founder and president, Ben & Jerry's Ice Cream (did not graduate)
 John C. Cushman III (1963), founder of Cushman Realty Corporation, then CEO and chairman of global transactions, Cushman & Wakefield
 Mark Divine (1985), founder of SEALFIT and former United States Navy SEAL
 Robert Duffy (1962), former owner, Duffy Broadcasting
 Cyrus Eaton (1941), chairman, Eaton Corp.
 David Fialkow (1981), co-founder, General Catalyst Partners
 Robert Kindler (1976), Vice Chairman and Global Head of Mergers and Acquisitions, Morgan Stanley
 William Brian Little (1964), founding partner of Forstmann Little & Company, the namesake of Little Hall at Colgate University
 Jim Manzi (1973), former CEO, Lotus Development Corp.
 Raymond W. McDaniel Jr. (1980), CEO, Moody's Corporation which operates Moody's Analytics and Moody's Investor Services
 Duncan L. Niederauer (1981), former CEO, NYSE Euronext
 Jack Shafer (1966), former division president, Allied Domecq (Dunkin Donuts, Baskin-Robbins)
 Thomas H. Weidemeyer (1969), Senior Vice President and Chief Operating Officer of the United Parcel Service, current director of the Goodyear Tire and Rubber Company.
 Bill Winters (1983), (CBE), current CEO, Standard Chartered; former co-head of investment banking, JPMorgan Chase
 Carmine Di Sibio (1985), Global Chairman and CEO, Ernst & Young;

Culture
 Peter Ackerman (1968), founding chair of the International Center on Nonviolent Conflict
 Jack L. Anson (1948), important leader in the American college interfraternity movement, and was known as "Mr. Fraternity."
 Thomas J. Pilgrim, in 1829, founded the first school in Texas, an all-boys school called the "Austin Academy"
 Justus H. Rathbone, founder of the international fraternal order of the Knights of Pythias
 Tim Walsh (1987), inventor of the game TriBond
 Armand Zildjian, (1944), former CEO of the Avedis Zildjian Company, the maker of cymbals, started in 1623 in Istanbul

Education
 Alida Anderson (1991), widely published academic researcher, author and professor of education at American University
Jack L. Anson (1948), former executive director, North American Interfraternity Conference
 Dr. Samuel H. Archer (1902), fifth president of the Morehouse College, selecting that school's colors (maroon and white) to reflect his own alma mater
 Shepard B. Clough (1923), professor of European history at Columbia University
 Andrew Dolkart (1973), James Marston Fitch Professor of Historic Preservation at Columbia University
 Emil Frei (1944), physician, oncologist and the Richard and Susan Smith Distinguished Professor of Medicine at Harvard Medical School
 Hall Gardner (1976), currently a professor of International Politics at the American University of Paris
 Charles A S Hall (1965), currently a professor at State University of New York in the College of Environmental Science & Forestry
 A. Thomas McLellan, psychiatry professor at the University of Pennsylvania
 Charles Franklin Phillips, (1931), economics professor at Colgate, President of Bates College
 Kevin M. Ross (1994), president of Lynn University
 William J. Simmons (1868), the second president of the eponymous Simmons College of Kentucky
 Herbert Storing (1950), Robert Kent Gooch Professor of Government and Foreign Affairs at the University of Virginia

Government & politics 
 William M. Anderson (1937), New York State Senator 1953-1989
 Doug Bailey (1954), founder of The Hotline
 Daniel P. Baldwin (?), Indiana Attorney General, 1880-1882
 Peter Burleigh (1963), U.S. Ambassador to India (acting), 2011–2012
 Kristie Canegallo (2001), White House Deputy Chief of Staff for Policy Implementation, 2014–2017
 James M. Catterson (1980), associate justice, Appellate Division of the New York Supreme Court, First Judicial Department, 2004–2012
 James Colgate Cleveland (1942), member of the U.S. House of Representatives from New Hampshire's 2nd congressional district, 1963–1981
 E. Virgil Conway (1951), former chairman and CEO, New York Metropolitan Transportation Authority, 1995–2001
 James Courter (1963), member of the U.S. House of Representatives from New Jersey's 12th congressional district, 1983–1991
 John Dean, White House Counsel, 1970-1973, during the administration of U.S. President Richard Nixon, witness to the Watergate scandal.
 Antonio Delgado (1999), U.S. Congressman, New York, 2019–present
 Kathleen A. Doherty (1985), first female U.S. Ambassador to Cyprus, 2015–2019
 John Durham (1972), U.S. Attorney for the District of Connecticut, 2018–present
 Perry B. Duryea Jr. (1942), Speaker of the New York State Assembly, 1969–1974
 Henry D. Edelman (1970), first president and chief executive officer of the Federal Agricultural Mortgage Corporation
 Peter Feldman (2004), commissioner of the U.S. Consumer Product Safety Commission
 Louis Frey (1955), member of the U.S. House of Representatives from Florida's 9th congressional district, 1973–1979
 Dario Frommer (1974), majority leader of the California State Assembly, 2004–2006
 Alan Frumin (1968), parliamentarian of the United States Senate, 2001–2012
 Drew Gattine (1983), member of the Maine House of Representatives, 2018–present
 Edward M. Grout (1861–1931), lawyer and New York City Comptroller
 Gary A. Lee (1960), member of the U.S. House of Representatives from New York's 33rd congressional district, 1979–1983
 Richard Harrington Levet (1916), judge, United States District Court for the Southern District of New York, 1956–1976
 James Howard Holmes (1965), U.S. Ambassador to Latvia, 1998–2001
 Charles Evans Hughes (attended), Chief Justice, U.S. Supreme Court, 1930–1941
 Monique Mehta, humanitarian and political activist
 Thomas R. Morgan (1952), USMC General, Assistant Commandant of the United States Marine Corps, 1986–1988
 Harlow S. Orton (1837), member of the Wisconsin Supreme Court from 1878 to 1895, the author of Vosburg v. Putney
 Sarah Peake (1979), Member of the Massachusetts House of Representatives from the 4th Barnstable district
 Peter N. Perretti, Jr. (1953) the Attorney General of New Jersey from 1989–1990
 Peter Peyser (1943), former U.S. congressman 1971–1977, 1979–1983
 Adam Clayton Powell (1930), New York congressman and civil rights leader
 William P. Rogers (1934), United States Secretary of State, United States Attorney General
 Mary Gay Scanlon (1980), U.S. Congresswoman, Pennsylvania 2019–present
 Richard B. Spencer (1997), alt-right leader and white nationalist (transferred to the University of Virginia),
 Peter Tarnoff (1958), Undersecretary of State, United States Department of State
 Donald S. Taylor (1919), judge, New York State Supreme Court, Appellate Div. 1948–1968
 Dean P. Taylor (1925), U.S. Congressman, New York 1943–1961
 Claudia Tenney (1983), U.S. Congresswoman, New York 2017-2019
 Ralph W. Thomas (1883), New York State Senator 1910-1914
 Gary Trauner (1980), politician from Wyoming
 Dennis Vacco (1974), 62nd New York State Attorney General
 Martha M. Walz (1983), Democratic member of the Massachusetts House of Representatives
 Perry Warren (1984), Member, Pennsylvania House of Representatives, 2017–present
 F. Clifton White (1940) U.S. political consultant, best remembered as the moving force behind the Draft Goldwater Committee 
 Elizabeth A. Wolford (1989), a United States District Judge of the United States District Court for the Western District of New York
 Paul Carey (1986), appointed U.S. Securities and Exchange Commission Commissioner by President William Jefferson Clinton, confirmed by US Senate in 1997, formerly Special Assistant to the President for Legislative Affairs at the White House, where he served from February 1993, handling banking, financial services; housing; securities; and other related issues. As Northeast Finance Director, Carey played a critical fund raising role in the Bill Clinton 1992 presidential campaign
 Edward D. Banta (1986), United States Marine Corps Lieutenant General (three star), serving as the Deputy Commandant for Installations and Logistics since July 9, 2021.

Journalism
 Jack Belden (1932), war correspondent, Life, Time, author, China Shakes the World
 Gloria Borger (1974), CNN, U.S. News & World Report, Washington Week, CBS special correspondent
 Monica Crowley (1990), Richard Nixon biographer; political and international affairs analyst, Fox
 Thomas A. Dine (1962), president, Radio Free Europe
 Jeff Fager (1977), Chairman CBS News; executive producer, 60 Minutes
 Howard Fineman (1970), chief political correspondent, senior editor, Newsweek
 Michael Gordon (1972), chief military correspondent, bestselling author, New York Times
 Chris Hedges (1979), war correspondent, New York Times
 Bud Hedinger (1969), talk radio host
 Michael Hiltzik (1973), Pulitzer Prize-winning journalist, Los Angeles Times
 David Lloyd (1983), sportscaster for ESPN 
 Austin Murphy, (1983), Senior writer, Sports Illustrated
 Kevin Phillips (1961), publisher, American Political Research Corp.
 Andy Rooney (1942), CBS-TV: 60 Minutes commentator, columnist
 Rob Stone (1991), Reporter and Commentator, Fox Soccer
 Priit Vesilind (1964), National Geographic Society Expedition's Editor and Senior Writer
 Bob Woodruff (1983), ABC News foreign correspondent

Literature
 Bill Barich (1965), author of Laughing in the Hills (1980), Hard to Be Good; Big Dreams: Into the Heart of California
 Philip Beard (1985), novelist
 Frederick Busch (1967), author, Fairchild Professor of Literature at Colgate (1976 to 2003)
 Pamela Druckerman (1991), novelist, Bringing Up Bébé (The Penguin Press: 2012)
 Kim Edwards (1981), novelist
 James D. Hornfischer (1987), author, The Last Stand of the Tin Can Sailors, Neptune's Inferno, The Fleet at Flood Tide
 Stephanie LaCava, (2004), author of An Extraordinary Theory of Objects: A Memoir of an Outsider in Paris
 Michael Lassell (1969), professional writer and editor
 John McGahern, novelist, Adjunct Professor of English at Colgate (1981 to 2006)
 Nathaniel Schmidt (1887), author, Baptist minister, educator and orientalist
 Theodore Pratt, writer, journalist, author of numerous novels set in Florida

Religion
 David Standish Ball (1950), bishop of Episcopal Diocese of Albany, N.Y.
 George Ricker Berry (1897), Professor of Semitic Languages - also Professor Emeritus of Colgate-Rochester Divinity School.
 James A. Corbett (1954), co-founder of the Sanctuary movement
 Harry Emerson Fosdick (1900), pastor/author
 John Tecumseh Jones, (attended 1829), Native American leader, Ottawa translator, Baptist minster, anti-slavery advocate in Kansas, founder of Ottawa University
 Joseph Endom Jones (1876), Baptist minister, professor at Virginia Union University
Philip L. Wickeri, Adviser to the Archbishop of Hong Kong for theological and historical studies and Professor of Church History at Hong Kong Sheng Kung Hui Ming Hua Theological College

Science, technology and medicine
 Oswald Avery (1900), helped lead groundbreaking DNA research
Albert Allen Bartlett (1944), physicist at University of Colorado Boulder, super conducting quantum interference device; arithmetic, population & energy
 David DeWitt (1970), technical fellow at Microsoft, leading the Microsoft Jim Gray Systems Lab at Madison, Wisconsin
 Gerald Fischbach, (1960), Scientific director overseeing the Simons Foundation Autism Research Initiative
 Emil Frei, (1944), Helped to establish the concept of combinatorial chemotherapy as a way of treating cancer
 Jay Jordan, president and CEO of OCLC
 Alan A. Jones (1966), leading researcher in the field of NMR and polymer physics and professor of chemistry at Clark University 
 Cris Kobryn (1974), technologist, system architect, entrepreneur
 Rudolph Leibel, (1963), scientist at Columbia University whose co-discovery at Rockefeller University of the hormone leptin, and cloning of the leptin and leptin receptor genes, has had a major role in the area of understanding human obesity.
 Cyrus Colton MacDuffee (1917), former president of the Mathematical Association of America (M.A.A)
 A. Thomas McLellan (1970), Executive Director of the Treatment Research Institute in Philadelphia
 Kevin Padian (1972), President of the National Center for Science Education
 H. Guyford Stever (1938), former head of National Science Foundation/NASA

Sports
 Ockie Anderson (1916), All-American football player and coach for the Buffalo All Americans Champion in cross country and indoor track (3000m)
 Peter Baum (2013), 2012 Tewaaraton Trophy winner and first overall pick of the 2012 Major League Lacrosse draft
 Kathryn Bertine (1997), professional racing cyclist, writer and former figure skater and triathlete
 Jamaal Branch (2005), running back, New Orleans Saints practice squad, winner of the 2003 Walter Payton Award for Division I-AA football
 Tad Brown (1986), CEO, Houston Rockets
 Tom Burgess (1986), former quarterback, Ottawa Rough Riders and Winnipeg Blue Bombers, MVP of 1990 Grey Cup
 Frank Castleman (1906), while at Colgate, he won the silver medal in the 200 metre hurdles at the 1904 Summer Olympics 
 Joe Castiglione (1968), former TV play-by-play man for the Cleveland Indians, currently radio play-by-play man for the Boston Red Sox
 Beth Combs, former basketball coach
 Brad Dexter (1996), former minor-league hockey player, now assistant coach of the Colgate men's hockey team
 Kiira Dosdall (2009), professional ice hockey player for the Metropolitan Riveters of the National Women's Hockey League (NWHL)
 Chris Dunn Olympic high jumper (Munich 1972), NCAA Indoor High Jump Champion (1972)
 Nate Eachus (2011), running back for the Kansas City Chiefs
 Rich Erenberg (1984), former running back, Pittsburgh Steelers
 Dan Fortmann (1936), Hall of Fame guard, Chicago Bears in the 1930s
 Adonal Foyle (1998), center, Orlando Magic
 David McIntyre, (2010), Canadian professional ice hockey forward who is currently with the Houston Aeros of the American Hockey League (NHL).
 David Gagnon  (1990), former goalie, Detroit Red Wings
 Kenny Gamble (1988), former running back, Kansas City Chiefs, also an assistant athletic director at Colgate and executive with Reebok
 Milt Graham  (1958), former professional football player, Boston Patriots
 Greg Hadley (2010), former linebacker and current coach for St. Lawrence University
 Nick Hennessey (2009), offensive lineman for the Buffalo Bills
 Marvin Hubbard (1968), fullback for the Oakland Raiders (1969–1975), Detroit Lions (1977)
 Ryan Johnston (2016), defenseman for the Montreal Canadiens
 Greg Manusky (1988), former linebacker, Washington Redskins, Minnesota Vikings, and Kansas City Chiefs, now defensive coordinator for the San Francisco 49ers
 Andy McDonald (2000), center for the St. Louis Blues
 Mike Milbury (1974), former defenseman for the Boston Bruins, former coach for Boston and the New York Islanders, former General Manager of the Islanders, and TV analyst for ESPN, NBC, TSN, and NESN
 Joey Mormina (2005), defenseman for the Pittsburgh Penguins
 Cory Murphy (2001), defenseman for the New Jersey Devils
 Mark Murphy (1977), former safety, Washington Redskins, former athletic director at Colgate and Northwestern University, president of the Green Bay Packers
 Lyndsay Meyer (1996), competitive ski mountaineer
 Clem Neacy (1924), former end and tackle, Milwaukee Badgers and Chicago Bears
 John Orsi (1932), All-American football player, College Football Hall of Fame member
 Bill Parcells (1958), NFL head coach, Pro Football Hall of Fame member
 Babe Parnell, National Football League player
 Steve Poapst (1991), former defenseman, Chicago Blackhawks
Will Rayman (2020), American-Israeli basketball player for Hapoel Haifa in the Israeli Basketball Premier League
 Mike Reidy (2012), soccer player, USL
 Doug Reffue (1992), vice president for operations for Sports Club/LA
 Eugene Robinson (1985), former safety, Carolina Panthers, Atlanta Falcons, Green Bay Packers, and Seattle Seahawks
 Lauren Schmetterling (2010), Olympic gold medalist, 2016 Summer Olympics in Rio de Janeiro
 Dick Sisler (1942), professional baseball player and manager
 Steve Spott (1990), head coach Toronto Marlies (OHL)
 Ebba St. Claire (1941) professional baseball player
 Mark van Eeghen (1974), former running back, Oakland Raiders
 Ernest Vandeweghe (1949), former player for New York Knicks, former surgeon for Los Angeles Lakers
 Ryan Vena (2000), professional arena football player (quarterback) for Wilkes-Barre/Scranton Pioneers
 Chris Wagner (2014), professional forward for Anaheim Ducks
 Jesse Winchester (2008), center for Ottawa Senators
 Kyle Wilson (2006), center for Columbus Blue Jackets

Current faculty
 Anthony Aveni, professor of astronomy and anthropology, one of the founders of archaeoastronomy
 Peter Balakian, professor of English, poet and writer, awarded the Pulitzer Prize for Poetry in 2016
 DeWitt Godfrey, associate professor art and art history
 Thomas J. Balonek, professor of physics and astronomy
 Joscelyn Godwin, professor of musicology
 John Knecht, professor of art and art history
 Amy Leventer, professor of geology, Antarctic researcher
 Graham Russell Gao Hodges, professor of history and Africana & Latin American studies
Beth Parks, associate professor of physics & astronomy, editor-in-chief of American Journal of Physics.

List of presidents
 Nathaniel Kendrick (1836–1848)
 Stephen William Taylor (1851–1856)
 George Washington Eaton (1856–1868)
 Ebenezer Dodge (1868–1890)
 George William Smith (1895–1897)
 George Edmands Merrill (1899–1908)
 Elmer Burritt Bryan (1909–1921)
 George Barton Cutten (1922–1942)
 Everett Needham Case (1942–1962)
 Vincent MacDowell Barnett, Jr. (1963–1969)
 Thomas A. Bartlett (1969–1977)
 George D. Langdon, Jr. (1978–1988)
 Neil R. Grabois (1988–1999)
 Charles Karelis (1999–2001)
 Rebecca Chopp (2002–2009)
 Jeffrey Herbst (2010–2015)
 Brian Casey (2016–Present)

References